Prisoners Education Trust is a UK national charity, which provides, supports, and argues the case for better learning and educational opportunities for prisoners. The Trust does this through a grants programme which assists over 2,000 prisoners each year to study distance learning courses in subjects and levels not available in prison. The Trust provides advice and support, and trains prisoners to be peer learning mentors. The charity also works with key stakeholders to improve policy and practice regarding prisoner learning.

Prisoners Education Trust is a registered charity based in Surrey, England, and supports prisoners in England and Wales.

The current director is Susan Simmonds. Patrons include Lord Ramsbotham, Baroness Stern, and Lord Woolf.

External links 

 

Charities based in Surrey
Prison charities based in the United Kingdom